Pedranzini may refer to:

Fabrizio Pedranzini (born 1954), Italian ski mountaineer and cross-country skier
Federico Pedranzini (born 1989), Italian ski mountaineer
Giambattista Pedranzini (1711–1761), Jesuit missionary
Pietro Pedranzini (1826-1903), Italian Lieutenant
Roberta Pedranzini (born 1971), Italian ski mountaineer

Italian-language surnames